Geraldine Francisca Leyton López (born 11 May 1989) is a Chilean footballer who plays as a left back for Santiago Morning and the Chile women's national team.

International career
Leyton represented Chile at the 2008 FIFA U-20 Women's World Cup.

Honours

Club
Colo-Colo
Chilean women's football championship (8): 2010, 2011 Apertura, 2011 Clausura, 2012 Apertura, 2012 Clausura, 2016 Clausura, 2017 Apertura, 2017 Clausura

References

External links

Geraldine Leyton at Txapeldunak.com 

1992 births
Living people
Footballers from Santiago
Chilean women's footballers
Women's association football fullbacks
Santiago Morning (women) footballers
Colo-Colo (women) footballers
Boca Juniors (women) footballers
Primera División (women) players
Sporting de Huelva players
Chile women's international footballers
Chilean expatriate women's footballers
Chilean expatriate sportspeople in Argentina
Chilean expatriate sportspeople in Spain
Expatriate women's footballers in Spain
Expatriate women's footballers in Argentina